Giovanni Astegiano (26 November 1940 – 15 August 1980) was an Italian biathlete. He competed in the 20 km individual event at the 1972 Winter Olympics.

References

External links
 

1940 births
1980 deaths
Italian male biathletes
Olympic biathletes of Italy
Biathletes at the 1972 Winter Olympics
Sportspeople from the Province of Cuneo
People from Limone Piemonte